Anthony Thomas Lambrianou (15 April 1942, Bethnal Green, London - 26 March 2004, Kent) was an English criminal known for his association with the Kray Twins. He was born to a Greek Cypriot father and English mother from Consett.

Lambrianou served 15 years in jail for his part in the murder of Jack "The Hat" McVitie in 1967.

Publications
Inside the Firm: The Untold Story of the Krays' Reign of Terror. 1991.

References

Further reading
Chris Lambrianou and Robin McGibbon. Escape: From the Kray Madness.

2004 deaths
English gangsters
English criminals
1942 births
English people of Greek Cypriot descent